Kronau is a municipality in Northern Karlsruhe district in Baden-Württemberg, Germany.

References

Karlsruhe (district)